Jean-Pierre Wafflard (born 27 December 1968) is a Belgian wrestler. He competed at the 1992 Summer Olympics and the 1996 Summer Olympics.

References

External links
 

1968 births
Living people
Belgian male sport wrestlers
Olympic wrestlers of Belgium
Wrestlers at the 1992 Summer Olympics
Wrestlers at the 1996 Summer Olympics
People from Saint-Josse-ten-Noode
Sportspeople from Brussels